Denmark is an unincorporated community in Lincoln County, Kansas, United States.

History
One of the first permanent settlements in Lincoln County, it was settled about 1869 by Danish Lutherans who laid the cornerstone for a stone church in 1876. Built of the "post rock" limestone that is so abundant in the county, it was completed in 1880. A bell tower and entry were added in 1901. The village is located 3 miles north of K-18 and still has a community hall, a railroad, and a grain elevator. Denmark is part of "The Amazing 100 Miles". The history and folklore has been described by Ruth Sorensen in "Beyond the Prairie Wind".

Education
The community is served by Sylvan–Lucas USD 299 public school district.

References

Further reading

 "Beyond the Prairie Wind", Ruth Sorensen, Partnership Book Services, Hillsboro, Kansas, Library of Congress catalog number 96-068921.
 "Souvenir History Lincoln County Kansas", Elizabeth Barr, 1908, Lincoln County Kansas Centennial Historical Committee reprinted with Addenda from Lincoln Sentinel Newspaper of September 8, 1955.
 "Pioneer History of Kansas", Adolph Roenigk, 1933, The Great Western Publishing Company Denver, Colorado.
 "Dog Soldier Justice", Jeff Broom, 2003, Bison Books.

External links
 Lincoln County maps: Current, Historic, KDOT

Danish-American culture in Kansas
Unincorporated communities in Lincoln County, Kansas
Unincorporated communities in Kansas
Populated places established in 1869
1869 establishments in Kansas